General elections were held in Thailand on 27 July 1986. The result was a victory for the Democrat Party, which won 100 of the 347 seats. Voter turnout was 61.4%.

Results

References

Thailand
General election
Elections in Thailand
General election